Eiríksmál is a skaldic poem composed c. 954 at the behest of the Norwegian queen Gunnhild 
in honour of her slain consort Erik Bloodaxe. Only the beginning of the poem is extant.

According to Roger of Wendover, Eric, a Viking ruler was betrayed and killed on Stainmore in 954 AD, while on the run and after being expelled from York. Eric had previously been King of Northumbria (c. 947–948 and 952–954) during his more successful days.

Structure
Although classified as a Skaldic poem since it deals with a historical figure, it is actually anonymous and in the simple fornyrðislag meter, rather than ornate dróttkvætt. It thus has much in common with the poems of the Poetic Edda. The later poem Hákonarmál appears to be modelled on Eiríksmál.

The poem is cast as a dialogue between Eric, the gods Odin and Bragi, and the legendary hero Sigmund.

Translation from Old Norse
Based on Finnur Jónsson’s Norse edition, English translation by Wikipedia editors.

Verse 1, Odin

Verse 2, Odin

Verse 3, Bragi

Verse 4, Odin

Verse 5, Odin

Verse 6, Bragi, Odin

Verse 7, Bragi, Odin

Verse 8, Sigmund

Verse 9, Erik

Notes

Citations

Sources

Online

 

 Finnur Jónsson's edition of Eiríksmál as part of Carmina Scaldica, Udvalg af norske og islandske skjaldekvad ved Finnur Jónsson, G.E.C. Gads Forlag - København 1929, online at heimskringla.no

Books

Skaldic poems
Sources of Norse mythology